Greek nationalism (or Hellenic nationalism) refers to the nationalism of Greeks and Greek culture. As an ideology, Greek nationalism originated and evolved in pre-modern times. It became a major political movement beginning in the 18th century, which culminated in the Greek War of Independence (1821–1829) against the Ottoman Empire. It became also a potent movement in Greece shortly prior to, and during World War I, when the Greeks, inspired by the Megali Idea, managed to liberate parts of Greece in the Balkan Wars and after World War I, briefly occupied the region of Smyrna before it was retaken by the Turks. 

Greek nationalism was also the main ideology of two dictatorial regimes in Greece during the 20th century: the 4th of August Regime (1936-41) and the Greek military junta (1967-74).

Today Greek nationalism remains important in the Greco-Turkish dispute over Cyprus among other disputes (Greek nationalism in Cyprus).

History

The establishment of Panhellenic sites served as an essential component in the growth and self-consciousness of Greek nationalism. During the Greco-Persian Wars of the 5th century BCE, Greek nationalism was formally established though mainly as an ideology rather than a political reality since some Greek states were still allied with the Persian Empire. Aristotle and Hippocrates offered a theoretical approach on the superiority of the Greek tribes. 

The establishment of the ancient Panhellenic Games is often seen as the first example of ethnic nationalism and view of a common heritage and identity.

During the times of the Byzantine Empire and after the capture of Constantinople in 1204 by the Latins, the Roman Emperor John III Doukas Vatatzes made extensive use of the words 'nation' (genos), 'Hellene' and 'Hellas' together in his correspondence with the Pope. John acknowledged that he was Greek, although bearing the title Emperor of the Romans: "the Greeks are the only heirs and successors of Constantine", he wrote. In similar fashion John’s son Theodore II, acc. 1254, who took some interest in the physical heritage of Antiquity, referred to his whole Euro-Asian realm as "Hellas" and a "Hellenic dominion". The generations after John looked back upon him as "the Father of the Greeks".

When the Byzantine Empire was ruled by the Paleologi dynasty (1261–1453), a new era of Greek patriotism emerged, accompanied by a turning back to ancient Greece. Some prominent personalities at the time also proposed changing the Imperial title from "basileus and autocrat of the Romans" to "Emperor of the Hellenes". This enthusiasm for the glorious past constituted an element that was present in the movement that led to the creation of the modern Greek state, in 1830, after four centuries of Ottoman rule.

Popular movements calling for enosis (the incorporation of disparate Greek-populated territories into a greater Greek state) resulted in the accession of Crete (1912), Ionian Islands (1864) and Dodecanese (1947). Calls for enosis were also a feature of Cypriot politics during British rule in Cyprus. During the troubled interwar years, some Greek nationalists viewed Orthodox Christian Albanians, Aromanians and Bulgarians as communities that could be assimilated into the Greek nation. Greek irredentism, the "Megali Idea" suffered a setback in the Greco-Turkish War (1919–1922), and the Greek genocide. Since then, Greco-Turkish relations have been characterized by tension between Greek and Turkish nationalism, culminating in the Turkish invasion of Cyprus (1974).

Nationalist political parties

Nationalist parties include:

Active
Golden Dawn (1985–)
Greek Unity (1989–)
Popular Orthodox Rally (2000–)
Society – Political Party of the Successors of Kapodistrias (2008–)
National Hope (2010–)
United Popular Front (2011–)
National Unity Association (2011–) 
National Front (2012–)
Independent Greeks (2012–)
Popular Greek Patriotic Union (2015–)
National Unity (2016–)
New Right (2016–) 
Greek Solution (2016–) (parliamentary)
National Popular Consciousness (2019–)
Greeks for the Fatherland (2020–)

Defunct
Nationalist Party (1865–1913) (parliamentary)
New Party (1873–1910) (parliamentary)
Liberal Party (1910-1961) (parliamentary)
Freethinkers' Party (1922–1936) (parliamentary)
National Union of Greece (1927–1944)
Greek National Socialist Party (1932–1943)
Hellenic Socialist Patriotic Organisation (1941–1942)
Politically Independent Alignment (1949–1951) (parliamentary)
Greek Rally (1951–1955)  (parliamentary)
4th of August Party (1965–1977)
National Democratic Union (1974–1977)
National Alignment (1977–1981)
United Nationalist Movement (1979–1991)
Party of Hellenism (1981–2004)
National Political Union (1984–1996)
Political Spring (1993–2004)
Hellenic Front (1994–2005)
Front Line (1999–2000)
Patriotic Alliance (2004–2007)

Gallery

File:Georgios Grivas 1967.jpg|Georgios Grivas, Greek nationalist and leader of Cypriot Enosis movement against British colonial rule.

See also
 Rise of nationalism in the Ottoman Empire

References

Citations

Sources

Further reading

 
Nationalism